
Gmina Łubniany, German Gemeinde Lugnian is a rural gmina (administrative district) in Opole County, Opole Voivodeship, in south-western Poland.

Since 2010 the village, like much of the area, has been officially bilingual in German and Polish.

The gmina contains part of the protected area called Stobrawa Landscape Park.

Villages
Gmina Łubniany contains the villages and settlements of:

Łubniany
Biadacz
Brynica
Dąbrówka Łubniańska
Grabie
Jełowa
Kępa
Kobylno
Kolanowice
Luboszyce
Masów

Neighbouring gminas
Gmina Łubniany is bordered by the city of Opole and by the gminas of Dobrzeń Wielki, Lasowice Wielkie, Murów and Turawa.

Twin towns – sister cities

Gmina Łubniany is twinned with:
 Arnstein, Germany

References

Lubniany
Opole County